Delmer Beshore (born November 29, 1956) is an American former professional basketball player, formerly in the National Basketball Association (NBA). Born in Mechanicsburg, Pennsylvania, he played college basketball with California University of Pennsylvania.

Biography
Beshore, a 5'11" and 165 lb point guard, spent the 1978–79 NBA season with the Milwaukee Bucks, appearing in one minute of one game and registering no statistics. His final NBA season, in 1979–80, was spent with the Chicago Bulls, with whom he averaged 3.6 points per game in 68 contests. He was selected by the Dallas Mavericks in the 1980 NBA expansion draft but did not end up playing with them.

Beshore also played in Italy with Sacramora Basket Rimini, with the Fresno Stars of the Western Basketball Association, and in 1984 was a player-coach with the Wyoming Wildcatters of the CBA. He is currently an assistant coach for Fresno Pacific University, where he has been since 1998.

NBA career statistics

Regular season 

|-
| align="left" | 1978–79
| align="left" | Milwaukee
| 1 ||  || 1.0 || .000 || .000 || .000 || 0.0 || 0.0 || 0.0 || 0.0 || 0.0
|-
| align="left" | 1979–80
| align="left" | Chicago
| 68 ||  || 12.8 || .352 || .385 || .667 || 0.9 || 2.0 || 0.9 || 0.1 || 3.6
|- class="sortbottom"
| style="text-align:center;" colspan="2"| Career
| 69 || 0 || 12.6 || .352 || .385 || .667 || 0.9 || 2.0 || 0.8 || 0.1 || 3.5
|}

References

External links 
NBA stats @ basketball-reference.com

1956 births
Living people
Basketball coaches from Pennsylvania
American expatriate basketball people in Italy
Basketball players from Pennsylvania
Basket Rimini Crabs players
California Vulcans men's basketball players
Chicago Bulls players
Dallas Mavericks expansion draft picks
Milwaukee Bucks players
People from Mechanicsburg, Pennsylvania
Point guards
Undrafted National Basketball Association players
Wyoming Wildcatters players
American men's basketball players
Western Basketball Association players